Glory of Heracles is a 2008 Japanese role-playing video game developed by Paon and published by Nintendo in Japan on May 22, 2008, for the Nintendo DS. It is the sixth game of the Glory of Heracles series. It was revealed at Electronic Entertainment Expo 2009 that this game would be the first in the series to be released outside Japan, which was later released in North America on January 18, 2010.

Gameplay
Glory of Heracles incorporates a turn-based battle system. During battle, the player's party and the opponents are positioned on a five column, two row grid. The front row allows characters to perform powerful melee attacks, while the back row is for ranged attacks, which can be either bows or magic spells. The order of attack is generally determined by the Agility of each character, but the order can be changed with certain spells or effects. The main feature of the battle system is the ability to power up offensive spells and skills by completing a small puzzle by inputting commands on the touch screen. The player can learn new skills and magic by visiting temples or Prometheus statues, respectively. Equipment will also provide the player's party with more abilities.

Ether is the source of magic in the game. Every spell adds or subtracts a set amount of Ether. There are five different elements of Ether in the game, known as Fire, Wind, Earth, Ice, and Dark. Any spell using Dark Ether will restore elemental ether, and vice versa. Ether restores after every turn of combat, and at the end of battles. If there is insufficient Ether for the spell, the difference is subtracted from the character's HP - this is referred to as Ether Reflux.

Plot
Glory of Heracles takes place in Ancient Greece and other parts of the Mediterranean region, with the plot drawing heavily from Greek mythology. The player names and assumes the role of the silent protagonist, though he speaks in battle, an immortal, amnesiac boy who is accompanied by the characters Leucos, Axios, Heracles and Eris on their journey to remember their pasts and to discover why they are immortal. Throughout the plot, the characters' stories become intertwined with other mythological figures and events such as Achilles and the Trojan war. The Taphus, an invention designed by Daedalus, is a recurring plot device which was punished by Zeus for extracting Ether from the world. Kazushige Nojima, the game's scenario writer, commented that the Japanese subtitle Tamashii no Shoumei ("proof of the soul") was central to one of the game's themes and that the player had to discover its meaning. The theme of an amnesiac cast was explored previously in Heracles no Eikou III, which was also written by Nojima.

Development
Japanese publications such as Famitsu stated that the speed during combat was quite sluggish. The American release addressed this issue by increasing the battle speed.

Reception

Reception for Glory of Heracles was mostly positive, but it was not without some criticism. RPGamer was critical of the dungeon designs and combat, and labeled the game "Average". Adriaan den Ouden posted a review saying: "Glory of Heracles isn't going to win any gold medals, but cheer for it anyways. It certainly tries hard". Patrick Gann of RPGFan was largely positive and seemed to express fears of the game keeping a low profile; he urged in his closing remarks: "I approached this game with cautious optimism and was rewarded for giving it a chance. I would ask that you do the same". He also noted the high quality of the game's localization in his final remarks.

Notes

References

External links
Official North American website
Official Japanese website

2008 video games
Nintendo DS-only games
Nintendo DS games
Nintendo games
Role-playing video games
Video games about amnesia
Video games developed in Japan
Video games set in antiquity
Video games based on Greek mythology
Video games scored by Yoshitaka Hirota
Video games set in Greece